Jasim Ahmed Jasim Abdulla Al-Shaikh (born 1 February 1996) is a Bahraini footballer who plays as a forward for Al-Ahli and the Bahrain national team.

Career
Al-Shaikh was included in Bahrain's squad for the 2019 AFC Asian Cup in the United Arab Emirates.

Career statistics

International

Scores and results list Bahrain's goal tally first.

References

External links
 
 
 
 
 Jasim Al-Shaikh at WorldFootball.com

1996 births
Living people
Sportspeople from Manama
Bahraini footballers
Bahrain international footballers
Association football forwards
Al-Ahli Club (Manama) players
Bahraini Premier League players
2019 AFC Asian Cup players